= The Trust for the Americas =

The Trust for the Americas is a non-profit 501(c)(3) affiliate of the Organization of American States that works to promote economic, social, and political development in Latin America and the Caribbean. Established in 1997, it works through public and private partnerships.

== Programs ==
The Trust's principal initiative, POETA (Partnership for Opportunities in Employment through Technology in the Americas), was launched in 2004 to provide technology training and job placement services to people with disabilities and at-risk youth across Latin America and the Caribbean. By the mid-2000s the program operated more than 60 centers in 11 Latin American and Caribbean countries, supported primarily by Microsoft, which contributed more than $1 million toward the program's expansion, alongside corporate partners including Siemens and DaimlerChrysler.

The organization also administers the DIA (Democratizing Innovation in the Americas) program, which supports entrepreneurship and civic-technology projects.

Each year, The Trust presents a Corporate Citizen of the Americas (CCA) award, first given more than 15 years ago, recognizing companies for corporate social responsibility programs in Latin America and the Caribbean.

== Structure ==
The Trust for the Americas is headquartered at the OAS in Washington, D.C., and maintains a legal presence in Colombia and Canada. Its Colombia office has supported the public-information component of the OAS Mission to Support the Peace Process in Colombia (MAPP/OEA) since 2005.
